Statistics of Moldovan National Division for the 1998–99 season.

Overview
It was contested by 10 teams and Zimbru Chişinău won the championship.

Fall season

Results

Spring season

Championship group

Results

Relegation group

Results

Goalscorers

References
Moldova - List of final tables (RSSSF)

Moldovan Super Liga seasons
1998–99 in Moldovan football
Moldova